Ron Hurst may refer to:

Ron Hurst (ice hockey) (born 1931), former Canadian ice hockey player who played in the National Hockey League
Ron Hurst (musician), American drummer in the band Steppenwolf